Mostly Coltrane is an album by American jazz pianist and composer Steve Kuhn recorded in 2008 and released on the ECM label. The album is a tribute to influential sax player John Coltrane, with whom Kuhn performed for a short period in 1960.

Reception 
The Allmusic review by Ken Dryden awarded the album 4 stars stating "Mostly Coltrane easily stands out as one of the best CDs among the countless tributes to John Coltrane and is one of Steve Kuhn's essential recordings within his extensive discography".

Track listing 
All compositions by John Coltrane except as indicated

 "Welcome" - 5:00
 "Song of Praise" - 7:31
 "Crescent" - 6:23
 "I Want to Talk About You" (Billy Eckstine) - 6:00
 "The Night Has a Thousand Eyes" (Buddy Bernier, Jerry Brainin) - 8:45
 "Living Space" - 5:12
 "Central Park West" - 3:50
 "Like Sonny" - 6:04
 "With Gratitude" (Steve Kuhn) - 3:41
 "Configuration" - 4:19
 "Jimmy's Mode" - 6:53
 "Spiritual" - 8:21
 "Trance" (Kuhn) - 5:24

Personnel 
 Steve Kuhn – piano
 Joe Lovano – tenor saxophone, tarogato
 David Finck – bass
 Joey Baron – drums

References 

ECM Records albums
Steve Kuhn albums
2009 albums
Albums produced by Manfred Eicher